"The Last in Line" is the third single released by heavy metal band Dio, appearing on their platinum-certified LP of the same name.  It was Dio's only song to hit the Top 10 of Billboard's Album Rock Tracks.

Unlike the band's first two singles, this song was not released as a single in the UK, but rather in the Netherlands and Spain. There is also an alternate version in the Netherlands sold only at the Pinkpop '84 festival on June 11, 1984. The sleeve of this release was the same as the band's previous single, "Rainbow in the Dark", with the Pinkpop logo in the corner.

The song was covered by Tenacious D for the 2014 This Is Your Life tribute album. Their cover won the Grammy Award for Best Metal Performance.

Charts

References

1984 singles
1984 songs
Dio (band) songs
Songs written by Jimmy Bain
Songs written by Ronnie James Dio
Songs written by Vivian Campbell
Vertigo Records singles
Grammy Award for Best Metal Performance